Khijadia Dosaji is a village and former non-salute Rajput princely state on Saurashtra peninsula in Gujarat, western India.

History 
It was a single village princely state in Gohelwar prant, under Gohel Rajput Chieftains.

It had a population of 361 in 1901, yielding a state revenue of 2,600 Rupees (nearly all from land; 1903–4) and paying 427 Rupees tribute, to the Gaekwar Baroda State and Junagadh State. 

During the British Raj, the petty state was under the colonial Eastern Kathiawar Agency.

External links 
History
 DSAL.UChicago - Kathiawar

Princely states of Gujarat
Rajput princely states